The Suheim bin Hamad Stadium, also known as Qatar SC Stadium, is a multi-purpose stadium in Doha, Qatar. It is currently used mostly for football matches and home of the football team Qatar Sports Club.

History
The stadium was opened 1985 and holds 13,000 people.
In 2010, it hosted the Qatar Athletic Super Grand Prix, the first meeting of the 2010 Diamond League. Some of the matches from the 2011 AFC Asian Cup were held in this stadium. In March 2014, it was announced that the stadium would host the 2015 IPC Athletics World Championships.

References

External links
Soccerway Profile

AFC Asian Cup stadiums
Football venues in Qatar
Sports venues in Doha
Qatar SC
Multi-purpose stadiums in Qatar
Al-Sailiya SC
Diamond League venues